Anne Kukkohovi (née Laaksonen; born 3 October 1970 in Vaasa) is a presenter and a retired Finnish model who has worked as a model from 1990 to 1998. She  worked as an art director in an advertising agency. Kukkohovi has also been a host on the Finnish television show Sinun unelmiesi tähden at the end of the 1990s.  She is currently the host of the Finnish version of America's Next Top Model, Suomen huippumalli haussa. Kukkohovi is married and has one child.

References

External links 
 Anne Kukkohovi juontaa Suomen Huippumalli haussa -sarjan

Finnish female models
Finnish television presenters
Living people
1970 births
Finnish women television presenters